Mollas may refer to three places in Albania:

Mollas, Elbasan, a village in the municipality of Cërrik, Elbasan County
Mollas, Fier, a village in the municipality of Lushnjë, Fier County
Mollas, Korçë, a village in the municipality of Kolonjë, Korçë County
Mollas, Berat, a village in the municipality of Skrapar, Berat County

See also 
 Molas (disambiguation)
 Molass (disambiguation)